The following lists events that happened during 2007 in Laos.

Incumbents
President: Choummaly Sayasone
Vice President:  Bounnhang Vorachith
Prime Minister: Bouasone Bouphavanh

Events

March
 March 4 - A 42-year-old woman has become the first person to die from bird flu in Laos. Authorities said they were awaiting further tests to see if the woman was infected with the H5N1 strain. The woman lived in a village near Vientiane, where the H5N1 virus has been found in poultry.
 March 8 - A 15-year-old girl from Laos has died from the virulent H5N1 strain of bird flu, becoming the country's first official fatality from the disease. The girl, who lived near the capital Vientiane, died while undergoing treatment at a hospital in neighbouring Thailand. A 42-year-old woman, who also lived close to Vientiane, died of suspected bird flu a few days ago. Tests have yet to confirm whether she died of the H5N1 virus.

May
 May 16 - A 6.1-MW earthquake strikes in remote northern Laos, and is felt as far away as Bangkok, Thailand, and Hanoi, Vietnam, where shoppers fled malls and high-rise buildings are evacuated. In Luang Prabang, 92 km. from the epicenter, residents say they felt only minor shaking. There are no reports of injuries or severe damage.

June
 June 4 - Former Royal Army of Laos general and Hmong military leader Vang Pao and nine others are charged in U.S. District Court in California with plotting to overthrow the Laotian government. The plan, prosecutors say, involved obtaining explosives, rifles, land mines and missiles, shipping them to Thailand, and using them blow up government buildings in Vientiane.
 June 5 - The Laotian government praises U.S. law enforcement officials for their arrest of Hmong military leader Vang Pao and the breaking up of a plot to overthrow the government. In Thailand, where the Laotian rebels had planned to ship their arms cache, officials say they will be investigating possible links to the case.
 June 11 - Bail is denied in U.S. federal court in Sacramento, California, for former Royal Lao Army general and Hmong leader Vang Pao, who is accused with nine others of plotting to overthrow the government of Laos. Around 2,000 supporters of Vang Pao gather outside the courthouse and protest.
 June 24 - More than 7,600 Laotian Hmong immigrants are moved to a new residential settlement to separate them from Thai-born Hmong in Phetchabun. The move was made for security purposes, as Thai Hmong were having to endure the same security Officials said as the Laotian Hmong.

References

 
Years of the 21st century in Laos
Laos
2000s in Laos
Laos